Tiffany Jones is a 1973 British comedy film directed and produced by Pete Walker and starring Anouska Hempel as the titular character. It was based on the British daily comic strip series Tiffany Jones by Pat Tourret and Jenny Butterworth. Other roles were performed by Ray Brooks and Eric Pohlmann.

Plot
The film focuses on Tiffany Jones, a photo model in Swinging London. However, here she also has a double life as a secret agent. The plot follows her as she tries to topple an Eastern European dictatorship in the fictional country Zirdana.

Cast
 Anouska Hempel: Tiffany Jones
 Ray Brooks: Guy
 Susan Sheers: Jo
 Damien Thomas: Prince Salvador 
 Eric Pohlmann: President Boris Jabal 
 Richard Marner: Vorjak
 Martin Benson: Petcek
 Alan Curtis: Marocek
 John Clive: Stefan
 Geoffrey Hughes: Georg
 Ivor Salter: Karatik
 Lynda Baron: Anna Karekin 
 Nick Zaran: Anton
 Walter Randall: Jan
 Martin Wyldeck: Brodsky
 Bill Kerr: Morton
 Tony Sympson: Prim man

Production

Music
The music was composed and conducted by Cyril Ornadel.

See also
 Tiffany Jones, the comic strip it was based on.

References

External links
 

1973 films
1970s sex comedy films
British sex comedy films
1970s English-language films
Films directed by Pete Walker
Films based on British comics
Films based on comic strips
Live-action films based on comics
1973 comedy films
1970s British films